Tolga District is a district of Biskra Province, Algeria.

Municipalities
The district has 4 municipalities:
Tolga
Bouchagroune
Bordj Ben Azzouz
Lichana

Districts of Biskra Province